The Museum of the Marine is a museum under development in Jacksonville, North Carolina, home of Marine Corps Base Camp Lejeune.  The museum will provide exhibits on individual Marines, Marine units, Marine families and support to Marines by local communities.

The planned galleries include:
Carolinas & the Corps
World Warriors Gallery
21st Century & Beyond

See also

Marine Corps Museums
United States Marine Corps
USS LSM-45

References

External links

Marine Corps museums in the United States
Military and war museums in North Carolina
Museums in Onslow County, North Carolina
Proposed museums in the United States